Bucculatrix nota is a moth in the family Bucculatricidae. It was described by Svetlana Seksjaeva in 1989. It is found in the Russian Far East (Primorsky Krai) and Japan (Honshu).

The forewings are creamy white, mixed with chocolate brown.

The larvae feed on Artemisia princeps. They mine the leaves of their host plant.

References

Natural History Museum Lepidoptera generic names catalog

Bucculatricidae
Moths described in 1989
Moths of Asia
Moths of Japan